The 1989 European Athletics Junior Championships was the tenth edition of the biennial athletics competition for European athletes aged under twenty. It was held in Varaždin, Yugoslavia (present-day Croatia) between 24 and 27 August.

Men's results

Women's results

Medal table

References

Results
European Junior Championships 1989. World Junior Athletics History. Retrieved on 2013-05-26.

European Athletics U20 Championships
International athletics competitions hosted by Yugoslavia
European Junior
Sport in Varaždin
1989 in youth sport
1989 in Yugoslav sport
European